The Mike Kelley Memorial Trophy is awarded annually to the Most Valuable Player of the Mann Cup competition.

The trophy is named after Michael Edward Francis "Mike" Kelley who was the owner and manager of the Hamilton Tigers lacrosse club in the early 1930s - and later the president of the Ontario Lacrosse Association and Canadian Lacrosse Association.

For some unknown reason, Kelley's name was misspelled and perpetuated as "Kelly" until the Canadian Lacrosse Hall of Fame was notified in 2014 of the error by the grandson of Mike Kelley. The Canadian Lacrosse Association and Canadian Lacrosse Foundation were notified during the 2015 Mann Cup series and corrections to the spelling would be made moving forward.

The Mann Cup is the senior men's lacrosse championship of Canada. The championship series is played between the Western Lacrosse Association champion and the Major Series Lacrosse champion.

Source:

See also
Mann Cup
Major Series Lacrosse (MSL)
Western Lacrosse Association (WLA)

References

Lacrosse in Canada
Lacrosse trophies and awards
Canadian sports trophies and awards